The Edo State Task Force Against Human Trafficking (ETAHT) is a Nigerian task force established by the Edo State Government to tackle human trafficking and irregular migration in the state, as well as the stigma that comes with it, State Task Force against human trafficking, is currently replicated in a host of southern states such as Ondo, Delta, Oyo, Lagos, Enugu, Ekiti States, etc.  Prof. Yinka Omorogbe the Attorney-General and Commissioner for Justice, Edo State, is also the chairman of the task force. In the year 2017, Mr Godwin Obaseki inaugurated the state task force on anti-human trafficking.  The members of the task force were inaugurated at the Government House in Benin City, the state capital.  The Edo Task Force Against Human Trafficking is said to have received about 5,619 returnees from Libya en-route Europe from 2017 till date.

The task force is made up of representatives from security agencies, NGOs, NAPTIP MDAS, religious and traditional institutions.

Mission 
To end human trafficking and irregular migration (modern-day slavery), as well as help, reintegrate returnees into society.

Objectives 

 To reduce the problem of human trafficking in Edo state.
 To assist in the rehabilitation and reintegration of victims of human trafficking in Edo state
 To research and promote strategies in tackling the scourge of human trafficking in Edo state
 To work in collaboration with relevant agencies/bodies in addressing the problem of human trafficking in Edo State

Committee Members 

 Professor (Mrs) Yinka Omorogbe  -  Chairperson of the task force
 Barr. Mrs Abieyuwa Oyemwense  -   Secretary to the Task Force

Partners and Affiliates 

 International Centre for Migration Policy Development (ICMPD)
 ActionAid
 United Nations High Commissioner for Refugees (UNHCR)
 Italian Police
 Girls' Power Initiative (GPI)
 Pathfinders justice initiative
 International Organization for Migration (IOM)

References 

Human trafficking in Nigeria
Edo State